The Moultrie High School in Moultrie, Georgia, United States was built in 1928-1929 and was listed on the National Register of Historic Places in 1982.  It later became the Colquitt County Arts Center, which offers art classes and other services.

It is a one-story U-shaped brick building covering most of an entire block which was built in Georgian Revival style.  It was designed by architect William J.J. Chase and was built by Moultrie contractor W.J. Pippin. The brick is laid in Flemish bond.

The Arts Center began as a project of the Moultrie Service League in 1977.

McCall art collection. He personally selected and donated to the Colquitt County Arts Center each piece of art in the collection, which is housed in the

A permanent McCall Gallery at the Colquitt County Arts Center houses the William Frank McCall Jr. Permanent Collection.

See also
 Colquitt County High School, the current high school serving the area

References

School buildings on the National Register of Historic Places in Georgia (U.S. state)
Georgian Revival architecture in Georgia (U.S. state)
Buildings and structures completed in 1928
National Register of Historic Places in Colquitt County, Georgia
High schools in Georgia (U.S. state)
1928 establishments in Georgia (U.S. state)
Arts centers in Georgia (U.S. state)
Tourist attractions in Colquitt County, Georgia